Philipp Manuel Fankhauser (born 20 February 1964 in Thun, Switzerland) is a Swiss blues musician and songwriter. Several of his albums have charted in the top ten of the Swiss Hitparade, such as Love Man Riding, which peaked at No. 7, Home, which peaked at No. 2, 
Try My Love, which peaked at No. 3, and the collaborative live album Unplugged - Live At Mühle Hunziken with Margie Evans, which peaked at No. 4. His album Heebie Jeebies - The Early Songs Of Johnny Copeland jumped straight to number one at the end of 2022.

Discography

Albums

References

1964 births
Living people
Blues musicians
Swiss male musicians
Swiss songwriters

People from Thun